Genesis 1:5 is the fifth verse in the first chapter of the Book of Genesis, part of the Genesis creation narrative. In this verse, God names the newly created day and night. Interpretation of this passage hinges on the interpretation of Genesis 1:4. "Evening and morning" bring the narrative of the first day of Creation to a close, and there are also multiple interpretations of this phrase.

Interpretations

Day and night
Commentator Paul Kissling writes that, by naming the day and the night, God reveals his sovereign power over them, seeing the light and darkness here as purely physical. In the Ancient Near East, "the act of giving a name meant, above all, the exercise of a sovereign right." Galia Patt-Shamir points out that the "power of names and naming" is displayed here, but that later in the narrative this power of naming is also granted to Adam, the first human.

According to John Calvin, God is here instituting "a regular vicissitude of days and nights."

The Zohar, on the other hand, interprets the verse as describing an emanation which would be "the foundation root of universal life."

Evening and morning

The definition of"evening" and morning" without the sun
The verse ends with a reference to evening and morning, which bring the first day of Creation to a close. This raises the question of how evening and morning are possible in the absence of the yet-to-be-created sun.

Augustine of Hippo, in his City of God, writes "our ordinary days have no evening but by the setting, and no morning but by the rising, of the sun; but the first three days of all were passed without sun, since it is reported to have been made on the fourth day." He explains the dilemma by interpreting the evening and morning in a metaphorical sense.

Length of day debate
Franz Delitzsch sees the evening and morning as marking the end of a "day" which is aeons in length, while others have seen it as marking a literal 24-hour day. Theistic evolution and day-age creationism follow the first interpretation, while young Earth creationism follows the second. Still others give a literary interpretation, in which the process of Creation is described in human terms, using the analogy of the working week.

Start of day interpretation
In Jewish tradition, the fact that evening is listed first here has led to the idea that the day begins at sunset.

Text

References

Genesis 1:5
Bereshit (parashah)
Hebrew Bible verses
Light and religion